Persatuan Sepakbola Indonesia Bandung ( 'Indonesian Football Association of Bandung'), commonly referred to as Persib Bandung, or simply Persib, is a professional football club based in Bandung, West Java, which competes in Liga 1, the top tier of Indonesian football. Persib is among Indonesia's most successful clubs, having won five Perserikatan titles and two Liga Indonesia titles. The team's home base is at the Gelora Bandung Lautan Api Stadium with a capacity of 38,000.

The club won its first Indonesian Super League (now known as Liga 1) title in 2014. Before the current league format, Persib won the 1994–95 Liga Indonesia Premier Division title, and five Perserikatan titles, all of which through tournament structures. Persib has also reached the quarter-finals of the Asian Club Championship in 1995.

History

Founding years (1933–1940) 
The earliest football organization in Bandung was the Bandoeng Inlandsche Voetbal Bond (BIVB) (Dutch for 'Bandung Domestic Football Federation') formed in 1923. It was succeeded by Persatuan Sepak Bola Indonesia Bandung (PSIB) ('Bandung Indonesian Football Association') and teams affiliated to the National Voetball Bond (NVB). These outfits merged on 14 March 1933 to form Persib.

Persib won the 1937 Dutch Indies football tournament and reached the finals in the 1933, 1934 and 1936 editions before Indonesia's 1945 independence.

Perserikatan era (1940–1994) 

After Indonesia's independence, Persib was reformed in Bandung in 1948, during the Indonesian National Revolution. In the 1950s, Persib players Aang Witarsa and Anas appeared for the Indonesia national football team.

In the Perserikatan era, when Indonesian football clubs were amateur outfits funded by local governments, Persib won their second national title in 1961 and competed in that year's Aga Khan Gold Cup. The club's next significant achievement was as runner-up in the 1966 season. Persib's success declined in the 1970s culminating with their relegation to the First Division in the 1978–79 season. In response, the club hired Polish coach Marek Janota to lead the youth squad and Risnandar Soendoro to manage the senior team. Under their guidance, Persib earned a promotion to the Premier Division, with players including Robby Darwis, Adeng Hudaya, Adjat Sudrajat and Suryamin. The team finished as runners-up in the 1982–83 and 1984–85 seasons.

The club won the league in 1986 by beating Perseman Manokwari by a goal from Djadjang Nurdjaman at the Senayan Stadium. They became champions again in 1990, beating Persebaya Surabaya 2–0. Among the players of this golden era were Samai Setiadi, Ade Mulyono, Asep Sumantri and Djadjang Nurdjaman who would become the only person to win a national title for Persib as a player and coach.

Persib became champions in the final season of the Perserikatan era before it was merged with the fledgling, semi-professional Galatama league to become the Liga Indonesia Premier Division and so earned the right to keep the President Cup in perpetuity.

Modern era and recent history (1994–2014) 

Persib Bandung in 1995 became the first champion of the newly formed Liga Indonesia Premier Division by beating Petrokimia Putra 1–0 in the final, which gave the club the right to compete at the Asian level. In 1995, Persib managed to reach the quarter-finals of the Asian Club Championship after beating teams from Thailand and the Philippines. While Persib failed to advance further, coach Indra Tohir was selected as the Best of Coach in Asia by the Asian Football Confederation.

Persib struggled to emulate the 1995 success in the next two decades. In 2008, Persib hired coach Jaya Hartono, who managed to push unheralded team Persik Kediri all the way to win the 2003 Liga Indonesia, to bring back its glory. Unfortunately, he only got Persib to third place. They had also used many foreign coaches such as Marek Andrzej Sledzianowski, Juan Páez and Arcan Iurie but the national title was elusive.

As a result of 2006-07 national government policies that restricted the use of state budget in professional football clubs after a series of financial scandals involving politicians and clubs in their jurisdictions, 36 stakeholders compelled then-Bandung mayor Dada Rosada to cut ties between the city's government and Persib. Their campaign led to the 20 August 2009 establishment of PT Persib Bandung Bermartabat, the company that currently runs Persib.

In 2012, Persib hired former player Djadjang Nurdjaman as their new head coach in another attempt to bring back its glory. However, his tenure started bumpy when in 2013 Persib could not use its traditional base Siliwangi Stadium for official matches, because PSSI degraded the class level of the old, rundown stadium to be only used as a training field. Persib then used the newly opened Si Jalak Harupat Stadium as a permanent home base although it was located in Soreang, outside the Bandung city borders. On 8 September 2014, Persib got the license as a professional club.

Golden era (2014–present)

2014 season 
The appointment of Djadjang turned out to be a correct move. In 2014, after almost two decades without any major trophy, Persib managed to win the national title in the 2014 Indonesia Super League by beating Persipura Jayapura in the final. Striker Ferdinand Sinaga also got the Best Player award for the 2014 season.

2015 season 
After the 2014 victory, Persib viewed the 2015 season with ambitious plans. They intended to use the facilities of Inter Milan in Italy but the plan was cancelled.
The national title also gave Persib a chance to compete in the 2015 AFC Champions League alongside Persipura.

However, the season had its ups and downs. While Djadjang was retained, he could not sit on the bench as a coach in an AFC catch due to his lack coaching certification and Emral Abus, who had never coached a winning team, was hired for the Asian competition. In its first game, Persib lost to Vietnam outfit Hanoi T&T F.C..

In consolation, in a pre-season local tournament, the 2015 Piala Walikota Padang, Persib won after defeating Persiba Balikpapan 2–0 in the final with coach Djadjang able to fully serve his role. While this gave Persib hope, bad signs began to emerge. Their first ISL match on 20 February 2015 against last year's runners-up Persipura Jayapura was cancelled after the sports ministry on 18 February postponed the 2015 ISL season due to clubs failing to complete their licensing processes. By May 2015, the licensing dispute between the government and clubs peaked with the 2015 Indonesia Super League officially discontinued on 2 May 2015 due to a ban from the sports minister against PSSI that forbade the federation from running any football competition.

2016 season 
At the beginning of 2016 the club announced it had agreed to collaborate with Italian Serie A club Inter Milan including coaching courses for Persib's Djadjang Nurdjaman.

2017 season 
Persib Bandung started the 2017 season with "unusual way" in the affairs of signings.
Label as an established team was shown the management of PT Persib Bandung Bermartabat to bring the two superstars at the same time, Michael Essien and Carlton Cole.
The arrival of the two former Chelsea FC players completed a transfer list of players who had done Persib in late 2016, as Dedi Kusnandar, Supardi Nasir, Achmad Jufriyanto, Wildansyah, Imam Arief Fadillah, and Japanese attacking midfielder Shohei Matsunaga.
That list does not include the planned Dutch-Indonesia descent midfielder Raphael Maitimo joined at the time of launching the team Persib on 2 April 2017.

2018 season 
The team announced Hector Cuper's former assistant coach at Lanus, Valencia, and Inter Milan, Roberto Carlos Mario Gomez as Persib's new coach on a two-year deal. Earlier in 2017, Roberto Carlos Mario Gomez was appointed as Malaysian national football team's head coach by FAM president Tunku Ismail Sultan Ibrahim, but he then asked for a higher salary and was therefore rejected as it was expensive. Essien was replaced by Argentine striker Jonathan Bauman due to exceeding foreign players quota.

2019 season 
Persib recruited Miljan Radović as Gomez's replacement as the Argentine coach moved to Borneo F.C. However, pre-season results were not satisfactory and Radovic was replaced by Robert Alberts before the league started. The team signed Artur Geworkýan and Rene Mihelič as it released Jonathan Bauman. Before the first half of the season ended, Serbian defender Bojan Mališić was transferred for free to Badak Lampung F.C. The team then brought Nick Kuipers and Kevin van Kippersluis from Holland, and Swedish-born Iranian-Filipino midfielder Omid Nazari to the roster, alongside Dhika Bayangkara. Fabiano Beltrame was also recruited, but he was not registered into the team roster due to exceeding the foreign players quota. His naturalization to Indonesian citizenship process was completed in December.

This season was noted as the final one for Hariono who decided to left the club after 11 years of service. The final match of the season saw Persib win 5–2 against PSM and he was given honorary tribute by the club and fans. Persib ended 2019 Liga 1 in 6th position, with 51 points from 13 wins, 12 draws, and 9 losses. Their 2018–19 Piala Indonesia campaign was stopped by Borneo F.C. in the quarter-finals on away goals.

2020 season 
Persib signed Geoffrey Castillion, Zulham Zamrun, Wander Luiz, Victor Igbonefo, Beni Oktovianto and Teja Paku Alam. In return, they released Hariono to Bali United F.C., Muchlis Hadi and Kevin van Kippersluis on free transfer, and Billy Keraf to Semen Padang. Ezechiel N'Douassel was sold to Bhayangkara F.C. for an undisclosed fee, also with Achmad Jufriyanto on a loan deal. They started the league with three victories in the first three matches against Persela (3-0) on 1 March, Arema (1-3) on 8 March, and PSS Sleman (2-1) on 15 March before the league was stopped due to COVID-19 restrictions in Indonesia. It was initially delayed until 2021, but was eventually cancelled in January 2021 which saw all the results be void.

2021-22 season 
It was announced that 2021 Liga 1 was to start in June 2021. Before the league started, a pre-season tournament called "Piala Menpora" was held which Persib were participating in. There were significant changes to Persib squad where Omid Nazari, Beni Oktovianto, Fabiano Beltrame, Zulham Zamrun, and Ghozali Siregar were all released. Kim Jeffrey was also released before joining PSS Sleman as he joined his brother-in-law Irfan Bachdim, who was married to his sister Jennifer Kurniawan. Former player Ferdinand Sinaga rejoined the club, alongside Jufriyanto, having finished his loan at Bhayangkara. Bayu Fiqri, an Indonesia U-19 international player, was also signed. Former PSV academy player Farshad Noor joined the club after the first match of Piala Menpora. However, he was released along with Sinaga before the league even started. At the end of first half of the season Geoffrey Castilion and Wander Luiz were given free transfer. Mohammed Rashid, Bruno Cantanhede, Marc Klok, David da Silva and several academy players were recruited. In the last match of the season against Barito, the team drew 1-1 which resulted in Barito escaping relegation over Persipura due to head-to-head rule. David da Silva's performance was heavily criticized by some people as he missed a number of scoring opportunities. Both teams were sued over allegedly match fixing, but the case was later dismissed as there were no proofs.

2022-23 season 
Prior to the league's start, Persib was overshadowed by GBLA stadium disaster that claimed 2 lives during the match against Persebaya in President's Cup. A pair of Indonesia internationals Ricky Kambuaya and Rachmat Irianto were signed from Persebaya. In total, 11 players were released, with notable ones including Esteban Vizcarra, Rashid,, Cantanhede, Ardi Idrus, and team captain Supardi. The team did not begin the season very well with failing to win first 3 matches, which resulted in resigning of Alberts as head coach. His assistant Budiman Yunus was the team's caretaker until  Luis Milla Aspas, former Indonesia national football team coach from Spain, was officially appointed Alberts' successor.

Crest and colors 

The club colors are officially blue and white. The club's badge is similar with the seal of Bandung. The logo was used because during the early years of Perserikatan, Persib was seen as the representative of the Sundanese people. The overall template of the logo is taken from the logo of the city of Bandung, including the wavy water pattern and the black fortress pattern. The only difference is the addition of the writing "PERSIB" and "1933". The logo is a heart-shaped shield, and is divided into two parts, outlined with black horizontal girders in four part of the shield.

On top of a golden yellow background with a green color painting of a mountain that rests on the girder.
At the bottom, with a white background by painting four areas wavy lines in blue. At the bottom of the shield there is a golden yellow color band waved at both ends. On the ribbon was written in black Latin letters that read 'Gemah Ripah Wibawa Mukti', meaning 'Land of the People Subur Makmur'. The sentence was taken from the Kawi language.

The logo's shield symbolizes the struggle to achieve goals that should be protected. In addition, the shield has the meaning that Persib needs to be able to endure all sorts of dangers and difficulties.

The colors in the logo represents, yellow: Wealth and nobleness, black: Sturdy, upright and strong, green: Prosperity and cool, white: Purity and faithfulness, and blue: Meaningful. Currently, on top of the logo stands two stars, which represents the two Indonesian league titles that Persib has achieved, the latter being in 1995 and 2014.

The club colors are officially blue and white according to its statute and is used by the fans, the combination Biru-bodas (blue and white), in their songs and chants. These were the colors of Siliwangi Kingdom. The club original badge was implemented in 1996 consisting of the team's name, Persib Bandung, above the logo of Bandung government.

In accordance to PSSI statute, the logo of the club is now protected as an effort to preserve its heritage and appreciation for the club as one of the founding members of PSSI in 1930. It is also not allowed to be altered and replaced in any forms. Additionally, this rule includes prohibition of changing the name, home base and history of the club.

Kit manufacturers

Kit history

Home

Away

Third

The club is presently outfitted by Sportama. Their previous kit sponsors are Adidas, Reebok, Nike, Vilour, Diadora, Joma, Mitre, and League.

The following is a list of kit manufacturers by year:

Sponsorship 

Persib is sponsored by.

 Indofood

 Kopi ABC

 Intersport Soccer

 Telkomsel

 Panther Energy

 Envi

 Fantasy Team by Vidio

 Socios

 Aladin

Grounds

Stadium 

Persib play their home matches at Gelora Bandung Lautan Api Stadium, after moving from Si Jalak Harupat Stadium. Gelora Bandung Lautan Api Stadium's design adheres to the international standards for stadium design. It has 38,000 individual seats. The grass used is Zoysia matrella (Linn) Merr which is of FIFA standard class. The stadium is equipped with; a football pitch, athletics track, offices, big screen and fireproof seats from Ferco Seating. The stadium has four storey with an area of 72,000 square meters, combined with other supporting facilities with total of 40 hectares.

It also has a total of 766 toilets, a VIP box with bulletproof glass, and a helicopter pad.

In 2022, Persib secured a deal with Bandung ciity government to lease the stadium for planned 30 years.

Training ground 
For the primary training ground and flat for players, Persib uses Persib Stadium at Ahmad Yani Road, which was formerly known as Sidolig Stadium. The training ground uses synthetic turf.
In addition to Siliwangi Stadium, the Persib party was exploring the possibility of using Arcamanik Stadium or Pusdikpom Field in Cimahi. Djanur also hopes his team were able to practice on natural grass surfaces and not synthetic like Lodaya Field.

Support

Supporters 
Persib Bandung have developed a strong following since their foundation in 1933. They have a large fanbase throughout the country and represent the Sundanese, mainly in West Java, Banten and in the Indonesian diaspora. Persib fans often refer to themselves as Bobotoh, this name comes from the Sundanese language, literally as; "people who turn on the spirit of people who want to fight (or animals who want to fight), supporters". They are one of the most popular clubs in Indonesia with 5 million fans.

Persib Bandung have several supporter organisations, including Viking Persib Club (VPC), Bomber Persib, Northern Wall, Frontline Boys, 26cc Boys and more. In 2021 the club's management announced the formation of Fansib Community as an official supporter in order to maintain closeness between supporters and the club, but its existence has drawn criticism from hardliners.

Halo, Halo Bandung is a national song created by Ismail Marzuki describing the spirit of struggle of the people of the city of Bandung during the post-independence period in 1946, especially during the Bandung Sea of Fire incident, the song is always sung by supporters at every home or away match in build up the fighting spirit of the players.

Notable fans include Oto Iskandar di Nata (Indonesian politician), Ridwan Kamil (Governor of West Java), Try Sutrisno (6th Vice President of the Republic of Indonesia), Kamidia Radisti (Miss Indonesia 2007), Arina Ephipania (lead vocalist of Mocca), Melody Nurramdhani Laksani (former JKT48 member), Bastian Steel (former Coboy Junior member), Nazril Irham (lead vocalist from Noah), Conchita Caroline (Sportcaster), and Ananda Omesh (Indonesian presenter).

Friendships 
2003 Liga Indonesia Premier Division in the play-off round at the Manahan Stadium, Solo, Viking Persib Club, a support organization of Persib Bandung, established a friendship or affiliation with Bonek, a supporter of the club Persebaya Surabaya. Their friendship is very strong and they can prove an equally strong supporter can unite at the Stadium. 27 July 2018, in an away match against Persebaya Surabaya at Gelora Bung Tomo Stadium, the Viking Persib Club organization choreographed the nicknames of their respective clubs, namely the Tiger and the Crocodile holding a drink to toast.

Rivalries 

The rivalry with Persija Jakarta referred to as Laga Klasik (English: The Indonesian Classic) is one of the most dangerous derbies in Indonesia. This rivalry heated up from the enmity of their supporters in the early 2000s, and is now a great rivalry between clubs. Before the match, players will be secured using Pindad Komodo to enter the stadium. Supporters of them may not be present at away matches, because of restrictions from the Indonesia national security otorition to avoid clashes.

Persib Bandung also has a rivalry with Persebaya Surabaya, PSM Makassar and PSMS Medan, the old derby in the Perserikatan competition.

Finances and ownership 
Persib Bandung is the richest club on Southeast Asia in 2015 with total wealth of 11.2 trillion rupiah according to Goal.com (Indonesian edition) website.

Persib's success on becoming one of the most powerful financial club is certainly not without means. Director of Marketing Persib Bandung, M. Farhan said that the club's success was not separated from the marketing team's performance.

Persib was previously owned by the city government and its budget was allocated from the city budget. In accordance with the regulations of Permendagri No. 13/2006 which was revised to Permendagri No. 59/2007, professional clubs are no longer allowed to use government budget. This condition forced 36 Football Union, the stakeholder of Persib, to agree giving a mandate to former Bandung Mayor Dada Rosada to save Persib so it can still enter the competition. PT. Persib Bandung Bermartabat (PT. PBB) was then founded on 20 August 2009 as the legal basis of the club.

Erick Thohir, the owner of Mahaka Media, Viva Media, Philadelphia 76ers, Satria Muda BritAma Jakarta, and former owner of D.C. United and Inter Milan, is one of the commissioners in PT. Persib Bandung Bermartabat.

Media coverage

Persib TV 
Persib TV has an official YouTube channel that is owned by Persib Bandung and contains club activities such as exclusive interviews with players and staff, club information and match highlights.

Affiliated clubs 
  Inter Milan
  Adelaide United

Persib Academy 
Persib Bandung launched Persib Academy directly affiliated with Inter Milan. The inauguration of Persib Academy was held at Siliwangi Stadium, Bandung, Indonesia on 13 February 2018. In the launching Persib bring then president and vice-president of Inter Milan, Erick Thohir and Javier Zanetti.
In addition, there were also Director and senior officials of Persib and also Director of Global Youth Business Inter Academy, Barbara Biggi and Inter Academy Head Coach, Andrea Ratti and his staff. For the academy cooperation, Inter Milan specifically brought in Inter Academy coach, Claudio Brambilla. The plan he will be in Bandung for two months ahead. He will provide direct treatment and share his knowledge to learners and coaches Persib Academy. Persib Academy is a form of collaboration with Inter Academy, not only presenting Inter Academy coaches, Persib Academy will use the academy curriculum based in Centro Sportivo Giacinto Facchetti, Milan, Italy.

Bandung United 
Bandung United competes in Liga 3, the third tier of Indonesian football. The club was founded in 2019 after the takeover of Blitar United by PT. Persib Bandung Bermartabat and its subsequent relocation to Bandung. It is the feeder club of Persib Bandung and holds its home matches at Siliwangi Stadium.

Prawira Bandung 
Through PT. PBB, Persib is related to Indonesian Basketball League club Prawira Bandung, having acquired and renamed the club from Garuda Bandung in 2018. The club is said to be "the basketball branch of Persib".

Players 

In 2017 the Football Association of Indonesia or PSSI restricted the number of foreign players to four per team including a slot for a player from Asian Football Confederation countries and a slot for a world class player. Each team could use four foreign players on the field each game.

Naturalized players

Out on loan

Club officials

Coaching staff

Head coach history 
Head coach by years (1980–present)

Noted: Writing Italic for the caretaker position.

Season-by-season records 

Key
 Tms. = Number of teams
 Pos. = Position in league

Honours

AFC (Asian competitions) 
AFC Champions League
1995– Quarter-finals
2015 – Preliminary round 2
AFC Cup
2015– Round of 16

AFC club ranking

Performance in AFC club competitions

See also 

 List of football clubs in Indonesia
 Indonesian football league system
 Indonesia national football team
 Prawira Bandung
 Bandung United F.C.

Further reading

References

External links 

  
 English website 
 Persib Bandung on Liga Indonesia website 
 
 Sepakbola - Persib Nu Aing on FIFA's website

 
Football clubs in Indonesia
Bandung
Sport in West Java
Association football clubs established in 1933
Indonesian Premier Division winners
1933 establishments in the Dutch East Indies
Football clubs in West Java